Shunyi West railway station is a railway station of Beijing-Shenyang high-speed railway located in Shunyi District, Beijing, China. It was opened on 22 January 2021.

References

Railway stations in Beijing
Stations on the Beijing–Harbin High-Speed Railway
Railway stations in China opened in 2021